We All Need Love is the eleventh studio album by Australian-born Irish singer and composer Johnny Logan, released in Europe in October 2003, with a bonus DVD recorded live on his 2003 European Tour.
The album charted in Denmark, Norway and Sweden.

Track listing

Charts

References

Johnny Logan (singer) albums
2003 albums